is a retired Japanese professional infielder.

External links

Living people
1988 births
Baseball people from Aichi Prefecture
Japanese baseball players
Meijo University alumni
Nippon Professional Baseball infielders
Chunichi Dragons players
Hanshin Tigers players
Saitama Seibu Lions players
Japanese baseball coaches
Nippon Professional Baseball coaches
People from Inazawa